Campbell Smith may refer to:

 Campbell Smith (cricketer) (born 1960), New Zealand cricketer
 Campbell Smith (playwright) (1925–2015), New Zealand playwright, poet and wood engraver